Symplocos celastrifolia is a plant in the family Symplocaceae, native to Southeast Asia. The specific epithet celastrifolia refers to the leaves' resemblance to those of species in the genus Celastrus.

Description
The grey or brown bark is smooth, becoming scaly. The curved twigs develop lenticels with age. The fruits become purple blue when ripe.

Distribution and habitat
Symplocos celastrifolia is broadly distributed in Southeast Asia: in Thailand, Peninsular Malaysia, Sumatra, Borneo, Sulawesi, the Maluku Islands, New Guinea and the Philippines.

References

celastrifolia
Flora of Malesia
Flora of New Guinea
Flora of Thailand
Plants described in 1882